Benjamin B. Busch is an American actor, writer, film maker, photographer, and United States Marine Corps Reserve officer. He is best known for his portrayal of Anthony Colicchio on the HBO original series The Wire.

Biography
Benjamin Busch was born in December 1968 in Manhattan and grew up in Poolville, New York. He attended Vassar College from 1987 through 1991. Busch graduated with a major in Studio Art and joined the United States Marine Corps, where he served as an active duty officer from 1992 to 1996. Resigning from active duty service in 1996, he continued to serve in the Marine Forces Reserve. In 1997 he began a career in acting, appearing in Party of Five, Homicide: Life on the Street, and The West Wing. He deployed to Iraq in 2003, where he served two tours of duty with the 4th Light Armored Reconnaissance Battalion. After his first deployment in 2004, he began playing the role of Officer Anthony Colicchio on the HBO series The Wire, appearing in the final three seasons of the show. In 2005, he deployed to Ramadi, Iraq as Team Leader for Detachment 3 of the 5th Civil Affairs Group. He later played the role of Major Todd Eckloff on the HBO mini-series Generation Kill. His first film as a writer/director, "Sympathetic Details", was released in February 2008.  His latest release, "Bright", was featured at the 2011 Traverse City Film Festival. In March 2022, Busch appeared in a CNN report from Ukraine entitled "American veterans train Ukrainian volunteers in combat."

Photography
Busch took photographs of his experiences in Iraq during his two tours of duty, which formed the basis for his exhibits of photographs, "The Art in War" (2003) and "Occupation" (2005). "Abstract Matter", his final exhibit of images from Iraq, was released in 2008.

Personal
He is the son of author and novelist Frederick Busch and grew up in upstate New York.

Memoir
In March 2012, Busch followed in his father's literary footsteps, publishing a memoir primarily about his wartime experiences, winning early critical acclaim. A review in the New York Journal of Books stated:  "No other writer has moved me as much as Benjamin Busch has in writing about war. No other writer has created such a moment of grace . . . Dust to Dust is a work of extraordinary merit. I’ve found no better book of any genre, by any author, so far this year, and likely will not in the months ahead."

Bibliography

Articles

Books

References

External links

Busch participates in panel discussion, Standing Down: From Warrior to Civilian at the Pritzker Military Museum & Library on December 4, 2013

1968 births
United States Marine Corps personnel of the Iraq War
Male actors from New York City
United States Marine Corps officers
United States Marine Corps reservists
Vassar College alumni
Living people
20th-century American male actors
21st-century American male actors